S-17092 is a drug which acts as a selective inhibitor of the enzyme prolyl endopeptidase. This enzyme is involved in the metabolic breakdown of a number of neuropeptide neurotransmitters in the brain, and so inhibiting the action of the enzyme increases the activity of these neuropeptides. This produces nootropic effects which make S-17092 a promising and novel treatment for neurodegenerative conditions such as Alzheimer's disease and Parkinson's disease.

See also 
 C16 (PKR inhibitor)
 UK-414,495

References 

Hydrolase inhibitors
Nootropics
Carboxamides
Indoles
Thiazolidines
Cyclopropanes